Quinta Normal Park is an urban park in the city of Santiago, Chile. The park is in a commune, or district of the same name, Quinta Normal. The park is bounded by Matucana Avenue to the east, Portales Avenue to the south and Santo Domingo Street to the north. It is home to several museums, including the Chilean National Museum of Natural History. Near the park is the Museum of Memory and Human Rights. The park is also near a public library.

The park can be accessed by the Santiago Metro via the metro station that bears its name.

The park was founded in 1841 for greenhouses to cultivate foreign plant species. The park is home to a railroad museum. The park is a place for children with a new water feature that children can play in and paddle boats. At the back of the park there are standing grills that anyone can use, to have a barbecue. In 1875 it was the site of the Chilean International Exhibition.

Across the street from the north side of the park lies the Sanctuary of Lourdes, which includes a Lourdes grotto.

References

External links

 Book about the agricultural history of the park

Urban public parks
Parks in Santiago, Chile
World's fair sites in South America